"My Girl" is a song co-written and recorded by American country music singer Dylan Scott.  It is included on his self-titled debut album and is his first number one hit on the Country Airplay chart.  The song was written by Scott and Josh Kerr.

Content
The song was described by Taste of Country as "a love song that finds him bragging on a girlfriend" and "What's charming is this self-described man’s man sharing of his tender side".

It was inspired by Scott's wife, Blair.

Critical reception
Matt Bjorke of Roughstock, in a review of the album, said that "It's a song that'll melt many a heart and one that could and should be his breakout hit."

Commercial performance
The song was certified Gold by the Recording Industry Association of America (RIAA) on June 20, 2017. It has sold 380,000 copies in the US as of August 2017.

Charts

Weekly charts

Year-end charts

Certifications

References

2016 songs
2016 singles
Dylan Scott songs
Curb Records singles
Songs written by Dylan Scott
Song recordings produced by Jim Ed Norman